General Shaw may refer to:

Anthony Shaw (British Army officer) (1930–2015), British Army major general
Charles Shaw (British Army officer) (1794—1871), British Army brigadier general
David Shaw (British Army officer) (born 1957), British Army major general
Frederick Shaw (British Army officer) (1861–1942), British Army lieutenant general
Frederick B. Shaw (1869–1957), U.S. Army brigadier general
Hugh Shaw (British Army officer) (1839–1904), British Army major general
James Shaw (British Army officer) (fl. 1970s–2000s), British Army major general
John E. Shaw (born 1968), U.S. Space Force lieutenant general
Jonathan Shaw (British Army officer) (born 1957), British Army major general
Samuel R. Shaw (1911–1989), U.S. Marine Corps brigadier general

See also
Jeff Shaw (politician) (1949–2010), Attorney General of New South Wales